Sanatan Sikh (Gurmukhi: ਸਨਾਤਨ ਸਿੱਖ sanātana sikha), a term and formulation coined by Harjot Oberoi, referred to Sikhs who formed a traditionalist faction during the Singh Sabha Movement in 1873. They campaigned for a Dharmic interpretation that accepted a wide range of beliefs drawn from Hinduism. The Amritsar Singh Sabha was led by Khem Singh Bedi, Avtar Singh Vahiria and others. Sanatan Sikhs accept beliefs and practices such as the belief in the teachings of the Vedas, Puranas, and Hindu epics. They also were tolerant to the use of idols and images of Sikh Gurus as well as other icons within Gurdwaras. Instead of treating scripture as the only guru, Sanatan Sikhs campaigned for acceptability of living gurus to guide those Sikhs who seek one.  Amid factional rivalry, the influence of the dominant Tat Khalsa ("true Khalsa"), due to the support of the Sikh masses, resulted in the decline of Sanatan Sikhs. Today, it is a marginalized interpretation of Sikhism.

See also 

 Keshdhari Hindus
 Rashtriya Sikh Sangat

References

 
Sikh politics